"We Three Kings" is a Christmas carol written by the Reverend John Henry Hopkins, Jr.

We Three Kings may also refer to:
We Three Kings (The Reverend Horton Heat album)
We Three Kings (The Roches album)
We Three Kings (The Bob and Tom Show album)

See also
 We the Kings, an American rock band